Boston is a surname. Notable people with the surname include:
Aliyah Boston (born 2001), American basketball player
Brandon Boston Jr. (born 2001), American basketball player 
Billy Boston (born 1934), Welsh rugby league footballer
David Boston (born 1978), American football player
Daryl Boston (born 1963), American baseball player
Lucy M. Boston (1892–1990), British author
Penelope Boston, speleologist who works at NASA
Rachel Boston (born 1982), American model and actress
Ralph Boston (born 1939), American track and field athlete
Richard Boston (1938–2006), British journalist and writer
Rob Boston (born 1962), author, advocate of church-state separation
Thomas Boston (1676–1732), Scottish theologian
Ward Boston Jr. (1923–2008), Navy captain

English toponymic surnames